The 1928–29 Eintracht Frankfurt season was the 29th season in the club's football history.

In 1928–29 the club played in the Bezirksliga Main-Hessen (Main division), the top tier of German football. It was the club's 2nd season in the Bezirksliga Main-Hessen (Main division).

The season ended up with Eintracht winning the Bezirksliga Main-Hessen (Main division). In the South German Championship round finished as 4th, not qualifying for the German Championship knockout stage.

Matches

Legend

Friendlies

Bezirksliga Main-Hessen (Main division)

League fixtures and results

League table

Results summary

Results by round

South German championship round

League fixtures and results

League table

Results summary

Results by round

Squad

Squad and statistics

|}

Transfers

In:

Out:

See also
 1929 German football championship

Notes

Sources

External links
 Official English Eintracht website 
 German archive site 

1928-29
German football clubs 1928–29 season